Cory Carroll (born February 25 in Halifax, Nova Scotia) is a Canadian professional poker player, who is a two time final tablist of World Poker Tour Championships and the winner of a World Series of Poker (WSOP) Circuit Championship Event.

Online poker
Carroll has made at least two final tables in the "Sunday Million", a $215 buy-in tournament with a $1 Million Guaranteed prize-pool on PokerStars. On October 15, 2006, Carroll, under the screenname "UGOTPZD", came in third place in the Sunday Million, earning $55,289.86. A month later he finished runner-up in the November 5th Sunday Million, earning $119,091.

World Series of Poker
In 2007, Carroll cashed in the money for the first time in the $10,000 No Limit Hold'em Main Event Championship coming in 91st place out of a field of 6,358 players, earning $67,535.

Carroll won the 2007 World Series of Poker circuit event at Caesars Palace in Las Vegas earning $515,176 for first place.

World Poker Tour
Carroll finished runner up to Jonathan Little during Sixth season of the World Poker Tour (WPT) Mirage Poker Showdown, earning $561,369.

Carroll was second in chips to Gus Hansen at the final table of the 2008 Five-Star World Poker Classic (the $25,500 WPT Championship) when Carroll Holding  was busted by Hansen holding  when the a flop came , Hansen with chip lead moved all-in, after a moment of thinking, Carroll called and was ahead in the hand with a pair of Jacks vs Hansen flush draw, the turn was the  leaving only one card to come, but when the river brought the  it gave Hansen a flush that won the hand and eliminating Carroll from the tournament in fourth place, earning him $593,645.  This left Hansen to exclaim to himself, as picked up by the television telecast microphones, "Insanity prevails, insanity prevails.

As of 2008, his total live tournament winnings exceed $1,800,000.

References

External links
 
 PokerListings.com interview
 
 

Canadian poker players
People from Halifax, Nova Scotia
World Series of Poker Circuit event winners
1980s births
Living people